Carolina Flatscher (born 18 May 1982) is an Austrian yacht racer who competed in the 2008 Summer Olympics.

References

1982 births
Living people
Austrian female sailors (sport)
Olympic sailors of Austria
Sailors at the 2008 Summer Olympics – 470
Place of birth missing (living people)